Captain Harry Gough (2 April 1681 – 13 July 1751), of Enfield, Middlesex,  was a British merchant and politician who sat in the House of Commons from 1734 to 1751.

Gough was the sixth son of Sir Henry Gough of Perry Hall  and his wife Mary Littleton, daughter of Sir Edward Littleton, 2nd Baronet, MP of Pillaton, Staffordshire.

Gough went to China with his uncle Richard Gough in 1692 when aged 11, and joined the British East India Company under his patronage. From 1707 to 1715 he was captain of a merchantman, the Streatham.  He was  named Deputy Chairman in 1736, full Chairman the next year, and then repeatedly held each post (Chairman again in 1741, 1743, 1746, and 1747; Deputy again in 1742, 1745, and 1750).

Gould was returned by his cousin Sir Harry Gough as member of Parliament  for Bramber, a notoriously rotten borough, at the  1734 British general election and voted consistently with the Administration. He was returned again in 1741 and 1747 attending debates assiduously in spite of gout.

Gough died on 13 July 1751, leaving a son and daughter. His son was the antiquarian, Richard Gough.

See also
 Gough-Calthorpe family

References

1681 births
1751 deaths
Members of the Parliament of Great Britain for English constituencies
British East India Company
British MPs 1734–1741
British MPs 1741–1747
British MPs 1747–1754
Gough-Calthorpe family